DR Byen station is a rapid transit station on the Copenhagen Metro. It is served by the M1 line. The station is elevated from ground level. It is located in fare zones 1 and 3, and opened in 2002.

The station is situated in the northern part of Ørestad. The name of the station is related to Danmarks Radio's new headquarters DR Byen (DR town) that lies close to the station. Originally, the station was named Universitetet Station, because of new university buildings were intended to be constructed near the station, but the project was moved nearer Islands Brygge Station, next to the old buildings.

References

External links 
 DR Byen station on www.m.dk 
 DR Byen station on www.m.dk 

M1 (Copenhagen Metro) stations
Railway stations opened in 2002
2002 establishments in Denmark
Railway stations in Denmark opened in the 21st century